George Ashmore Fitch (1883–1979) was an American Protestant missionary in China, YMCA, Nanking Safety Zone International Committee Administrative Director, and the grandfather of politician George B. Fitch.
Fitch was born in Suzhou, China, the son of Presbyterian missionaries George F. and Mary (McLellan) Fitch. He graduated from the College of Wooster, Ohio in 1906, and Union Theological Seminary in New York with a Bachelor of Divinity in 1909. He was ordained in the Presbyterian Church in 1909 and went to China to work with YMCA in Shanghai.

Nanking Massacre
When the Nanking Massacre occurred in 1937–1938, Fitch, who was head of YMCA there, served as director of the International Committee for the Nanking Safety Zone. He compiled a diary and filmed some of the atrocities committed by the Imperial Japanese Army in Nanking in December 1937.

 December 24, 1937

Writing later in his autobiography, Fitch said, "My story created a sensation in Shanghai, for it was the first news of what had happened in the capital since its evacuation, and it was copied and mimeographed and widely distributed there." In 1938 Fitch traveled throughout the United States giving talks about the Nanking Massacre and showing films to document it.

In the documentary film Nanking, Fitch was portrayed by actor John Getz.

After George Fitch departed, Hubert Lafayette Sone was elected Administrative Director of the Nanjing International Relief Committee, successor to the Nanking Safety Zone.

Subsequent career
Fitch returned to China in 1939 to serve with YMCA and later with the United Nations Relief and Rehabilitation Administration until 1947. He then served YMCA in Korea and Taiwan until 1961, when he retired in the United States. He died in Claremont, California.

Fitch was a Freemason.

Bibliography
George A. and Geraldine T. Fitch, My Eighty Years in China (1967)

Further reading
Zhang, Kaiyuan, ed. Eyewitnesses to Massacre, An East Gate Book, 2001. (includes documentation of American missionaries; M.S. Bates, George Ashmore Fitch, E.H. Foster, J.G. Magee, J.H. MaCallum, W.P. Mills, L.S.C. Smyth, A.N. Steward, Minnie Vautrin and R.O. Wilson.)  (Google Books version)
biographical sketches: one from The National Cyclopedia of American Biography; one by George A. Fitch entitled "Grand Old Man of the Pacific-and of YMCA"; a March 1949 issue of Science of Mind.

References

Biographical Dictionary of Christian Missions, Macmillan Reference USA, copyright (c) 1998 Gerald H. Anderson, The Gale Group; Wm. B. Eerdmans Publishing Co., Grand Rapids, Michigan

External links
http://www.bdcconline.net/en/stories/f/fitch-george-ashmore.php
http://www.interq.or.jp/sheep/clarex/discovery/discoverylog03.html
http://special.lib.umn.edu/findaid/html/ymca/yusa0012.phtml
https://web.archive.org/web/20070922143410/http://www.history.gr.jp/~nanking/nanking.html

1883 births
1979 deaths
American Freemasons
American Protestant missionaries
Protestant missionaries in China
People assisting Chinese during the Nanjing Massacre
American humanitarians
American expatriates in China
YMCA leaders